League1 British Columbia (L1BC) is a semi-professional men's and women's soccer league in British Columbia, Canada, which began play in May 2022. The league is sanctioned by the Canadian Soccer Association and the BC Soccer Association as a pro-am league in the Canadian soccer league system. The league is a member of League1 Canada.

L1BC operates at the same level as League1 Ontario and the Première ligue de soccer du Québec. The semi-professional league was created to fill in the gap between the top amateur leagues in the province, such as the Pacific Coast Soccer League, Fraser Valley Soccer League, Vancouver Island Soccer League and Vancouver Metro Soccer League, with the professional top tier Canadian Premier League. The league winner qualifies for the national Canadian Championship for the following year.

History
BC Soccer originally looked into the possibility of starting a "Regional Tier 3" league in their 2016 Strategic Plan, with the goal of beginning in 2018 with eight teams. However, nothing came to fruition due to insufficient interest from clubs. In June 2019, they announced their intention to begin play in 2021 with at least six clubs. Teams would need to commit for three years minimum and field teams in both the male and female divisions. The proposed league would be open to professional clubs fielding reserve sides, provided they are not branded with "Reserves" or "U-23" in their team name.

In January 2021, the league was rumoured to be launching later that year with six or eight teams, including a development team from the Major League Soccer club Vancouver Whitecaps FC. On October 5, 2021, the league was officially announced by BC Soccer to begin play in May 2022. The inaugural league began on May 22, with the Championship Final occurring on August 1 (British Columbia Day), with seven clubs participating in the first season. It was announced that with the creation of the league, the Juan de Fuca Plate, which was previously awarded to the top BC-based Premier Development League team in head-to-head matches, would now be awarded to the League1 BC club that accrued the greatest number of points across both the men’s and women’s divisions in an aggregate table. In addition, a cedar trophy was created to be awarded to both the men's and women's division champions. In November 2022, it was confirmed that the league winner would qualify for the following season's Canadian Championship, the national cup tournament.

Competition format
The L1BC regular season lasts approximately two months, from late May to late July. Teams play each other team home and away for a total of 12 matches in 2022. The regular season champion and runner-up advance to a single match final where the winner is crowned finals champion.

Yearly results

Current clubs
Eight teams are members of the league, of which five are based in Greater Vancouver, two in Vancouver Island, and one in the province's interior. All teams compete in both the  men's and women's divisions of the league.

Timeline

L1BC clubs in other competitions

See also

 Canadian soccer league system
 League1 Alberta
 League1 Ontario
 Première ligue de soccer du Québec
 USL League Two

References

External links
BC Soccer Association
BC Soccer Regional Tier 3 League Operations Manual (2016)

League1 British Columbia
Soccer leagues in Canada
Can
Professional sports leagues in Canada
2021 establishments in British Columbia
Sports leagues established in 2021
Soccer in British Columbia
Sports leagues in British Columbia
League1 Canada